WGCA is a local Christian radio station in Quincy, Illinois broadcasting on 88.5 MHz FM. The station airs a Contemporary Christian music format, and serves the areas of Quincy, Illinois, Hannibal, Missouri, and Keokuk, Iowa.

History
Started in 1987 as a cable radio station called Sunshine Radio, WGCA grew and was soon established as a full-fledged broadcast radio station.

Over the course of its history, WGCA has sponsored a number of events and concerts in the Quincy, IL area. In its early years, it welcomed artists like Rebecca St. James and Todd Agnew. In 2005–07, the then-WGCA-FM was the primary local sponsor for SHOUTfest, which is a group of traveling contemporary Christian artists. These day-long concerts were held at Quincy's Clatt Adams Park. In the 2010s, they brought artists like Casting Crowns, Skillet, Newsboys, and For King & Country.

In addition to concerts, WGCA has also been active in bringing special events like March For Jesus and MixFest.

References

External links

GCA
Radio stations established in 1988
1988 establishments in Illinois
Contemporary Christian radio stations in the United States
Religious radio stations in the United States